The Korg Electribe A (EA-1) is an analogue modeling synthesizer in the Korg Electribe series first produced in 1999.

Functions

The EA-1 can store a total of 256 (64 x 4 banks) phrases or patterns plus 16 songs consisting of multiple patterns.

The EA-1 can be synchronised to other MIDI devices using tap tempo or MIDI clock, or by tapping in the beat and synchronising to a turntable or other non-MIDI sound sources.

See also
 Roland TB-303
 Korg ER-1
 Korg Electribe series

References

Further reading

External links 

E